Gerrit Eijsker also written as Gerrit Eysker (19 July 1901 – 31 October 1969) was a Dutch discus thrower. He competed at the 1928 Summer Olympics and placed 24th.

References

1901 births
1969 deaths
Dutch male discus throwers
Athletes (track and field) at the 1928 Summer Olympics
Olympic athletes of the Netherlands
Sportspeople from Zaanstad
20th-century Dutch people